WJJZ (94.5 MHz) is a commercial FM radio station licensed to Irasburg, Vermont.  It is owned by Vermont Broadcast Associates, Inc., and airs a country music radio format.  Vermont Broadcast Associates, whose principal owner is Bruce James, also owns WMOO in Derby Center and WIKE in Newport.  All three stations have studios and offices on U.S. Route 5 in Derby.

WJJZ's transmitter is off Guyette Road in Irasburg.  It first signed on in 2014.

The call sign WJJZ had previously been long associated with various radio stations in the Philadelphia, Pennsylvania, market, including two radio stations in Mount Holly, New Jersey, and two smooth jazz stations: WJJZ 106.1 from 1993 to 2006, and WJJZ 97.5 in New Jersey from 2006 to 2008.

References

External links

JJZ
Country radio stations in the United States
Radio stations established in 2014
2014 establishments in Vermont